Gina Bianchini (born 1972) is an American entrepreneur and investor. She is the Founder & CEO of Mighty Networks.

Early life and career 
She grew up in Cupertino, California, graduated with honors from Stanford University, started her career in the nascent High Technology Group at Goldman Sachs, and received her M.B.A from Stanford Graduate School of Business.

Before Mighty Networks, she was CEO of Ning, which she co-founded with Marc Andreessen.

In addition to Mighty Networks, Gina serves as a board director of TEGNA (NYSE: TGNA), a $3 billion broadcast and digital media company, and served as a board director of Scripps Networks (NASDAQ: SNI), a $12 billion public company which owns HGTV, The Food Network, and The Travel Channel that merged with Discovery Communications in 2018.

Gina has been featured on the cover of Fortune and Fast Company and in Wired, Vanity Fair, Bloomberg, and The New York Times. She has appeared on Charlie Rose, CNBC, and CNN.

References

Living people
American women chief executives
Stanford Graduate School of Business alumni
American women computer scientists
American computer scientists
1972 births
American technology company founders
American women company founders
American company founders
Goldman Sachs people
Stanford University alumni
People from Cupertino, California
People from Saratoga, California
21st-century American businesspeople
21st-century American women